Matthias Gelzer (19 December 1886, Liestal – 23 July 1974, Frankfurt am Main) was a Swiss-German classical historian, known for his studies of the Roman Republic in regard to its politics and society. He was the author of highly regarded biographies on Julius Caesar, Pompey and Cicero.

He studied history and classical philology at the universities of Basel and Leipzig, where in 1909 he received his doctorate as a student of Ulrich Wilcken. In 1912 he obtained his habilitation at the University of Freiburg with a thesis on the nobility of the Roman Republic. In 1915 he became a professor of ancient history at the University of Greifswald, and in 1918 relocated as a professor to the University of Strasbourg. From 1919 to 1955 he was a professor of ancient history at the University of Frankfurt am Main, where he served as its rector in 1924/25.

Selected works 
 Studien zur byzantinischen Verwaltung Ägyptens, 1909 – Studies on Byzantine-administered Egypt.
 Die Nobilität der römischen Republik, 1912 – Nobility of the Roman Republic,
 Die Nobilität der Kaiserzeit, 1915 – Nobility of the Empire.
 Caesar, der Politiker und Staatsmann, 1921, translated into English and published in 1968 as "Caesar: politician and statesman".
 Vom römischen Staat; zur Politik und Gesellschaftgeschichte der römischen Republik, 1944 – The Roman state. Politics and social history of the Roman Republic.
 Pompeius, 1949 – Biography of Pompey. 
 Cicero; ein biographischer Versuch, 1969 – Biography of Cicero.
From 1925 to 1962 he was on the editorial board of the journal "Gnomon", for which he contributed numerous reviews. He was also the author of several entries in the Pauly-Wissowa "Realencyclopädie der classischen Altertumswissenschaft".

References 

1886 births
1974 deaths
People from Liestal
University of Basel alumni
Leipzig University alumni
Academic staff of the University of Greifswald
Academic staff of the University of Strasbourg
Academic staff of Goethe University Frankfurt
20th-century German historians
Members of the German Academy of Sciences at Berlin
Corresponding Fellows of the British Academy
Members of the Royal Swedish Academy of Sciences